Undina (sometimes Undine or Ondine) is an opera in three acts by Pyotr Ilyich Tchaikovsky. The work was composed in 1869. The libretto was written by Vladimir Sollogub, and is based on Vasily Zhukovsky's translation of Friedrich de la Motte Fouqué's novella Ondine.

History
The opera was composed during the months of January to July 1869, but Tchaikovsky destroyed the score in 1873, preserving only a few numbers from the opera. The opera has never been performed in its entirety.

The only extracts that survive are:
Introduction
Aria: "Waterfall, my uncle, streamlet, my brother" (Undina)
Chorus: "Help, help! Our stream is raging"
Duet: "O happiness, O blessed moment" (Undina, Huldbrand)
Chorus: "O hours of death" (soloists, chorus)

At least three of these pieces – the aria, the duet, and the final chorus – were performed at the Moscow premiere at the Bolshoi Theatre in Moscow on 28 March 1870.

Some music from the opera was subsequently re-used in Tchaikovsky's other works:
The bridal procession of act 3 was adapted for the Andantino marziale of his Symphony No. 2 "Little Russian" (1872).
The introduction was used unchanged as the introduction to his incidental music to Ostrovsky's play The Snow Maiden (1873).
Undina's aria was somewhat altered and put to use as the first song of Lel in The Snow Maiden.
The duet was recycled as the duet (No. 13-V) of Siegfried and Odette in act 2 of Swan Lake (1875–1876). The vocal parts were replaced by solo cello and violin.

Roles

Instrumentation
Strings: violins, violas, cellos, and double basses
Woodwinds: piccolo, 2 flutes, 2 oboes, 2 clarinets (B-flat), 2 bassoons
Brass: 4 horns (all F), 2 trumpets (B-flat), 2 trombones, tuba
Percussion: timpani, triangle, cymbals, bass drum
Other: harp, piano
Source

Setting
Time: The 15th century

Place: Germany, near the springs of the Danube; Ringstetten Castle (Burg Ringstetten)

Recordings
Vocal and orchestral numbers
"Excerpts from the Opera Undine" Tamara Milashkina (Undine), Yevgeny Raikov (Gulbrand), Moscow Radio Chorus (Konstantin Lebedev, director), Moscow Radio Symphony Orchestra, Yevgeny Akulov, conductor. Melodiya / ABC Westminster Gold WGS 8300, 1975. LP.Features three selections from Undina: act 1: Undine's Song; act 1: Finale; act 3: Duet of Undine and Gulbrand.
"Undine: fragments from the unfinished opera" Tamara Milashkina (Undine), Yevgeny Raikov (Gulbrand), Moscow Radio Chorus, Moscow Radio Symphony Orchestra, Yevgeny Akulov. Melodiya, 1988. CD.A CD reissue of the above LP, subsequently re-released by Mobile Fidelity Sound Lab (Petaluma, California) in 1989. It features the same three selections as in the 1975 issue, plus the introduction (Ouverture), with the Moscow Radio Symphony Orchestra conducted by Alexander Gauk.
"Vodopad moy dyadya" from Undina, On Guilty Pleasures. Renée Fleming, soprano, Philharmonia Orchestra, Sebastian Lang-Lessing, conductor. London/Decca B0019033-02, 2013. CD.
Undina: surviving fragments. Anna Aglatova (Undina), Aleksey Tataritsev (Gulbrand), Tchaikovsky Symphony Orchestra and Chorus of the Popov Academy of Choral Arts, Vladimir Fedoseyev, conductor. Published 23 November 2015.Concert performance of all five surviving numbers, including the previously unrecorded "Bridal March", recorded 13 November 2015 at the Tchaikovsky Concert Hall in Moscow, with Mikhail Fillipov reciting extracts from Zhukovsky's story.

References

External links
 

Operas by Pyotr Ilyich Tchaikovsky
Russian-language operas
1869 operas
Operas
Operas based on plays
Lost operas
Operas set in Germany
Operas set in the 15th century
Works based on Undine (novella)